In optics, the inverse Faraday effect is the effect opposite to the Faraday effect. A static magnetization  is induced by an external oscillating electrical field with the frequency , which can be achieved with a high intensity laser pulse for example.

From this equation we see that the circularly polarized light with the frequency  should induce a magnetization along the wave vector . Because  is in the vector product, left- and right-handed polarization waves should induce magnetization of opposite signs. 

The induced magnetization is comparable to the saturated magnetization of the media.

References 

Magneto-optic effects